West of Wyoming is a 1950 American Western film directed by Wallace Fox and starring Johnny Mack Brown, Gail Davis and Myron Healey.

Plot

Cast
 Johnny Mack Brown as Johnny Mack Brown 
 Gail Davis as Jennifer Draper 
 Myron Healey as Brodie 
 Dennis Moore as Dorsey - Henchman 
 Stanley Andrews as Simon Miller 
 Milburn Morante as Panhandle Jones 
 Mary Gordon as Nora Jones 
 Carl Mathews as Ray Barton - Henchman 
 Paul Cramer as Terry Draper 
 John Merton as Sheriff 
 Mike Ragan as Chuck Maloo - Henchman 
 Steve Clark as Dalton

References

Bibliography
 Michael L. Stephens. Art Directors in Cinema: A Worldwide Biographical Dictionary. McFarland, 1998.

External links
 

1950 films
1950 Western (genre) films
American Western (genre) films
Films directed by Wallace Fox
Monogram Pictures films
American black-and-white films
1950s English-language films
1950s American films